The Myrtle Beach Pelicans are a Minor League Baseball team in Myrtle Beach, South Carolina, and the Single-A affiliate of the Chicago Cubs. The Pelicans compete in the Carolina League. Home games are played at Pelicans Ballpark, which opened in 1999 and seats up to 6,599 people.

The Pelicans have been members of the Carolina League since 1999 and most recently won the league's championship in 2016. On February 12, 2020, Major League Baseball announced that the Pelicans had accepted a Professional Development League license to continue as the Cubs' Low-A affiliate in the Low-A East. This league was renamed the Carolina League and reclassified as Single-A in 2022.

From their inaugural season through 2010, they were affiliated with the Atlanta Braves, before spending four seasons as a Texas Rangers affiliate from 2011 to 2014. The team's current affiliation with the Chicago Cubs began in 2015.

History
Previously, this franchise was known as the Durham Bulls, but relocated following the 1997 season as a result of the expansion of the Triple-A International League into Durham, North Carolina, where the new franchise assumed the "Bulls" name. It spent the 1998 season in Danville, Virginia, as the Danville 97s, awaiting a move to Myrtle Beach while their new stadium, Coastal Federal Field, was under construction. When then their home ballpark opened its gates on April 12, 1999, for the franchise's first game, 5,521 fans came to see the Pelicans play the Potomac Cannons. In the first at bat, Pelicans pitcher Luis Rivera struck out Cannons hitter Esix Snead looking. The first two hits at the stadium were home runs for each team, first by Potomac's Andy Bevins, and later that same game by Myrtle Beach's Ryan Lehr.

Their ballpark has since been renamed Pelicans Ballpark, which is a family-friendly stadium with a speed pitch, obstacle course, and moon bounce on the concourse. In 2004, Baseball America rated it the second-best Class-A level ballpark in the United States, and the best in the Carolina League in 2009. For four consecutive seasons (2011–2014), Stadium Journey ranked the Pelicans as the top stadium experience in the Carolina League, and one of the publication's "Top 50 Stadium Experiences" in all of sports, while TripAdvisor named the team the third-best attraction in Myrtle Beach.

Notable games

In their first season, the Pelicans advanced to the 1999 Carolina League Mills Cup Championship series. The best-of-five series against the Wilmington Blue Rocks was tied 2–2, with the deciding Game 5 set to be played in Myrtle Beach, when the series was cancelled because of Hurricane Floyd. The two teams were named co-champions for that season.

Myrtle Beach won both the first and second-half Southern Division titles in 2008 under Rocket Wheeler, who was named Carolina League Manager of the Year. The following season, Jason Heyward played over half the year in Myrtle Beach en route to being named Baseball America's 2009 Minor League Player of the Year.

On July 3, 2014, the Pelicans home game with the Winston-Salem Dash was broadcast on the CBS Sports Network, the first time the Pelicans were on live national television.

Front office changes
In early 2006, Capitol Broadcasting Company announced plans to sell the Pelicans. The current owner is Myrtle Beach Pelicans LP, a group led by lawyer Chuck Greenberg.

On November 20, 2012, General Manager Scott Brown left to join the Triple-A Charlotte Knights of the International League. A month later, on December 21, 2012, the Pelicans hired Andy Milovich to become the club's Vice President and General Manager. By January 14, 2015, Milovich was promoted to President and General Manager.

On September 16, 2014, the Myrtle Beach Pelicans reached an agreement on a player development contract (PDC) with the Chicago Cubs, beginning with the 2015 season.

On December 2, 2021, Kristin Call, the team's former associate general manager, was promoted to general manager, making her the first female general manager in team history.

Reclassification
On February 12, 2020, it was announced that the Pelicans, who played at the Advanced-A level of minor league baseball since the team was started in 1999, would move to Low-A in a new Major League Baseball player development alignment. The Pelicans swapped places with the Chicago Cubs' affiliate in South Bend, Indiana, which was feeding players to the Pelicans as they moved up in the Cubs' organization. The move meant that the Pelicans will predominantly get players who are in their first full seasons of pro ball. Dropping a level, the Pelicans were closer to their division opponents. The Pelicans were placed in the South Division of Low-A East, which comprises three divisions. The Charleston RiverDogs, Columbia Fireflies, and Augusta GreenJackets in North Augusta, South Carolina, are in the South Division as well. In 2022, the Low-A East became known as the Carolina League, the name historically used by the regional circuit prior to the 2021 reorganization, and was reclassified as a Single-A circuit.

Playoffs
1999 season: Defeated Kinston 2–1 in semifinals; tied Wilmington 2–2 in championship.
2000 season: Defeated Lynchburg 3–0 to win championship.
2002 season: Lost to Kinston 2–0 in semifinals.
2008 season: Defeated Winston-Salem 3–1 in semifinals; lost to Potomac 3–1 in championship.
2011 season: Lost to Kinston 3–1 in semifinals.
2012 season: Lost to Winston-Salem 2–1 in semifinals.
2013 season: Lost to Salem 2–0 in semifinals.
2014 season: Defeated Salem 2–1 in semifinals; lost to Potomac 3–1 in championship.
2015 season: Defeated Winston-Salem 2–1 in semifinals; defeated Wilmington 3–0 to win championship.
2016 season: Defeated Salem 2–1 in semifinals; defeated Lynchburg 3–1 to win championship.
2017 season: Lost to Down East 2-0 in semifinals.

Notable former players
Several Pelicans have gone on to play in the major leagues. Some of these are:

Retired numbers
Myrtle Beach has honored three of its members by retiring their uniform numbers.

Roster

See also
Current and former players

References

External links
 
 Statistics from Baseball-Reference

Baseball teams established in 1980
Sports in Myrtle Beach, South Carolina
Professional baseball teams in South Carolina
Atlanta Braves minor league affiliates
Chicago Cubs minor league affiliates
Texas Rangers minor league affiliates
Carolina League teams
1980 establishments in North Carolina
1999 establishments in South Carolina